Simon Cruz (born Simon Söderström; 26 July 1979), is a Swedish rock singer most famous for being the former lead singer for the Swedish sleaze rock band Crashdïet.

Pre-Crashdïet
Details of Cruz's early life, such as his childhood are virtually unknown..  At some point in his twenties Cruz lived in London, England, which he has cited as the reason he has a British accent. Simon was in several bands prior to Crashdïet: Foxey, T.I.T.S., and most notably Jailbait . In previous bands Cruz went by the aliases of Zymon Xaint
, and Zimmy South.

Crashdïet
When Crashdïet auditioned people to replace their original lead singer Dave Lepard after his death in January 2006, Cruz was their top choice. Cruz, however, decided to continue with his band Jailbait, causing Crashdïet to go with H. Olliver Twisted as their new lead singer.   Upon H. Olliver Twisted being kicked out of Crashdïet in 2008, they were once again in search of a new singer.  The band sought out Cruz again, and in July 2009, they announced Simon Cruz as their new lead singer. Cruz made his debut performance with the band in October 2009 at the Sweden Rock Cruise.  
Cruz has toured Europe, South America, Australia, and North America with Crashdiet.
Cruz is the first Crashdïet singer to be featured on two consecutive albums, appearing on 2010s "Generation Wild" (Crashdïet's most popular album to date) and 2013's  The Savage Playground.

On 26 February 2015, Crashdïet announced the departure of Cruz.

Savage Animal
After leaving Crashdïet, Cruz has begun to work with his ex-girlfriend Tåve Wanning (Peaches, Adrenaline Rush) on a common music project called Savage Animal.

Discography

With Crashdïet

Generation Wild (2010)
The Savage Playground (2013)

References

External links
Official Crashdïet website

1979 births
Living people
English-language singers from Sweden
Rhythm guitarists
21st-century Swedish singers
21st-century guitarists
21st-century Swedish male singers
Crashdïet members